Each country's final squad has to comprise 21 players. FIFA announced the squads on 25 July 2018.

Group A

France
Head coach: Gilles Eyquem

Ghana
Head coach: Yusif Basigi

New Zealand
Head Coach: Gareth Turnbull

Netherlands
Head Coach: Michel Kreek

Group B

Brazil
Head Coach: Dorival Bueno

England
Head Coach: Mo Marley

Mexico
Head Coach: Christopher Cuéllar

North Korea
Head Coach: Hwang Yong-bong

Group C

Japan
Head Coach: Futoshi Ikeda

Paraguay
Head Coach: Epifania Benítez

Spain
Head Coach: Pedro López

United States
Head coach:  Jitka Klimková

Group D

China PR
Head Coach:  Peter Bonde

Germany
Head Coach: Maren Meinert

Haiti
Head Coach:  Marc Collat

Nigeria
Head Coach: Christopher Danjuma

References

FIFA U-20 Women's World Cup squads